Monica Mutsvangwa is Zimbabwe's Minister of Information, Publicity and Broadcasting Services. She has held cabinet roles in both the Robert Mugabe government and the Emmerson Mnangagwa government.

She has been active in Zimbabwe's politics since 2002 when she ran as a councillor in Harare's municipal elections. She is affiliated with Zanu-PF. In Robert Mugabe's government, she served as the Deputy Minister of Information, Media and Broadcasting Services and the Deputy Minister Macro-Economic Planning and Investment Promotion.

References

Year of birth missing (living people)
Living people
Government ministers of Zimbabwe
Women government ministers of Zimbabwe
21st-century Zimbabwean politicians
21st-century Zimbabwean women politicians
ZANU–PF politicians
Members of the Senate of Zimbabwe